Kristin O'Neill (born March 30, 1998) is a Canadian women's ice hockey player. She made her debut for the Canada women's national ice hockey team at the 2018 4 Nations Cup.

Playing career
In 2013, O'Neill participated with Team Ontario Blue at the 2013 Canadian Under-18 Women’s Nationals, securing a silver medal. O'Neill was named to the Ontario team which captured the silver medal in women's ice hockey at the 2015 Canada Winter Games.

Later that year, she would win the PWHL championship with the Stoney Creek Jr. Sabres. With the same Sabres team, she would also gain a silver medal at the 2015 OWHA Provincial championships.

During her final season (2015–16) of PWHL hockey, she was bestowed the captaincy of the Stoney Creek Jr. Sabres. Leading the team in goals, assists and points, she ranked sixth overall in the PWHL. In addition, she was part of the Team Ontario Red roster that won the gold medal at the 2015 Canadian Under-18 Women's Nationals.

NCAA
As a freshman, O'Neill ranked second in scoring on the Cornell Big Red. Finishing as the NCAA’s leading scorer in shorthanded goals with five, she would place seventh in the nation among all freshman with 0.84 points per game.

O'Neill experienced greater success as a sophomore. In addition to leading the Big Red in scoring, she tied for the NCAA lead in shorthanded goals, scoring four, while her seven game-winning goals tied for fourth in the nation. Recognized as the Ivy League Player of the Year, she also gained spots on the ECAC and Ivy League First-Team All-Stars, respectively.

Hockey Canada
O'Neill and Jamie Lee Rattray would record the assists on Loren Gabel’s first career goal for the Canadian team in a 2-1 preliminary round loss on November 7, 2018, versus the United States at the 4 Nations Cup.

Career statistics

PWHL

NCAA
2018-19 season in progress

Hockey Canada

Awards and honours
2017 ECAC All-Rookie Team
2017 Ivy League Rookie of the Year
2017 Ivy League Second All-Star Team
2016-17 NCAA leader in shorthanded goals (5)
2018 Ivy League Player of the Year Award
2017-18 First Team All-Ivy
2019-20 First Team All-Ivy

References

1998 births
Living people
Canadian women's ice hockey forwards
Cornell Big Red women's ice hockey players
Ice hockey people from Ontario
Sportspeople from Mississauga
Professional Women's Hockey Players Association players